Eugen Peder Lunde (18 May 1887 – 17 June 1963) was a Norwegian sailor who competed in the 1924 Summer Olympics. In 1924 he won the gold medal as a crew member of the Norwegian boat Elisabeth V in the 6 metre class event.

Personal 
Eugen Lude was the father of Peder Lunde, the father-in-law of Vibeke Lunde, the grandfather of Peder Lunde Jr. and the great-grand father of Jeanette Lunde — all Olympic sailors for Norway.

References

External links
 
 
 

1887 births
1963 deaths
Norwegian male sailors (sport)
Olympic sailors of Norway
Sailors at the 1924 Summer Olympics – 6 Metre
Olympic gold medalists for Norway
Olympic medalists in sailing
Medalists at the 1924 Summer Olympics